The duodenum is the first section of the small intestine in most higher vertebrates, including mammals, reptiles, and birds. In mammals it may be the principal site for iron absorption.
The duodenum precedes the jejunum and ileum and is the shortest part of the small intestine.

It begins with the duodenal bulb and ends at the suspensory muscle of duodenum. Duodenum can be divided into four parts: the first (superior), the second (descending), the third (horizontal) and the fourth (ascending) parts.

Overview 
The duodenum is the first section of the small intestine in most higher vertebrates, including mammals, reptiles, and birds. In fish, the divisions of the small intestine are not as clear, and the terms anterior intestine or proximal intestine may be used instead of duodenum. In mammals the duodenum may be the principal site for iron absorption.

In humans, the duodenum is a C-shaped hollow jointed tube,  in length, lying adjacent to the stomach (and connecting it to the small intestine). It is divided anatomically into four sections. The first part lies within the peritoneum but its other parts are retroperitoneal.

Parts
The first part, or superior part, of the duodenum is a continuation from the pylorus to transpyloric plane. It is superior to the rest of the segments, at the vertebral level of L1. The duodenal bulb is a remnant of the mesoduodenum, a mesentery that suspends the organ from the posterior abdominal wall in fetal life. The first part of the duodenum is mobile, and connected to the liver by the hepatoduodenal ligament of the lesser omentum. The first part of the duodenum ends at the corner, the superior duodenal flexure.

Relations:
 Anterior
Gallbladder
Quadrate lobe of liver
 Posterior
Bile duct
Gastroduodenal artery
Portal vein
Inferior vena cava
Head of pancreas
 Superior
Neck of gallbladder
Hepatoduodenal ligament (lesser omentum)
 Inferior
Neck of pancreas
Greater omentum
Head of pancreas
The second part, or descending part, of the duodenum begins at the superior duodenal flexure. It goes inferior to the lower border of vertebral body L3, before making a sharp turn medially into the inferior duodenal flexure, the end of the descending part.

The pancreatic duct and common bile duct enter the descending duodenum, through the major duodenal papilla. The second part of the duodenum also contains the minor duodenal papilla, the entrance for the accessory pancreatic duct. The junction between the embryological foregut and midgut lies just below the major duodenal papilla.

The third part, or horizontal part or inferior part of the duodenum is 10~12 cm in length. It begins at the inferior duodenal flexure and passes transversely to the left, passing in front of the inferior vena cava, abdominal aorta and the vertebral column. The superior mesenteric artery and vein are anterior to the third part of duodenum. This part may be compressed between the aorta and SMA causing superior mesenteric artery syndrome.

The fourth part, or ascending part, of the duodenum passes upward, joining with the jejunum at the duodenojejunal flexure. The fourth part of the duodenum is at the vertebral level L3, and may pass directly on top, or slightly to the left, of the aorta.

Blood supply
The duodenum receives arterial blood from two different sources. The transition between these sources is important as it demarcates the foregut from the midgut. Proximal to the 2nd part of the duodenum (approximately at the major duodenal papilla – where the bile duct enters) the arterial supply is from the gastroduodenal artery and its branch the superior pancreaticoduodenal artery. Distal to this point (the midgut) the arterial supply is from the superior mesenteric artery (SMA), and its branch the inferior pancreaticoduodenal artery supplies the 3rd and 4th sections.
The superior and inferior pancreaticoduodenal arteries (from the gastroduodenal artery and SMA respectively) form an anastomotic loop between the celiac trunk and the SMA; so there is potential for collateral circulation here.

The venous drainage of the duodenum follows the arteries. Ultimately these veins drain into the portal system, either directly or indirectly through the splenic or superior mesenteric vein and then to portal vein.

Lymphatic drainage

The lymphatic vessels follow the arteries in a retrograde fashion. The anterior lymphatic vessels drain into the pancreatoduodenal lymph nodes located along the superior and inferior pancreatoduodenal arteries and then into the pyloric lymph nodes (along the gastroduodenal artery). The posterior lymphatic vessels pass posterior to the head of the pancreas and drain into the superior mesenteric lymph nodes. Efferent lymphatic vessels from the duodenal lymph nodes ultimately pass into the celiac lymph nodes.

Histology
Under microscopy, the duodenum has a villous mucosa. This is distinct from the mucosa of the pylorus, which directly joins to the duodenum. Like other structures of the gastrointestinal tract, the duodenum has a mucosa, submucosa, muscularis externa, and adventitia. Glands line the duodenum, known as Brunner's glands, which secrete mucus and bicarbonate in order to neutralise stomach acids. These are distinct glands not found in the ileum or jejunum, the other parts of the small intestine.

Variation

Gene and protein expression 

About 20,000 protein coding genes are expressed in human cells and 70% of these genes are expressed in the normal duodenum. Some 300 of these genes are more specifically expressed in the duodenum with very few genes expressed only in the duodenum. The corresponding specific proteins are expressed in the duodenal mucosa, and many of these are also expressed in the small intestine, such as alanine aminopeptidase, a digestive enzyme, angiotensin-converting enzyme, involved in controlling blood pressure, and RBP2, a protein involved in the uptake of vitamin A.

Function
The duodenum is largely responsible for the breakdown of food in the small intestine, using enzymes. The duodenum also regulates the rate of emptying of the stomach via hormonal pathways. Secretin and cholecystokinin are released from cells in the duodenal epithelium in response to acidic and fatty stimuli present there when the pylorus opens and emits gastric chyme into the duodenum for further digestion. These cause the liver and gallbladder to release bile, and the pancreas to release bicarbonate and digestive enzymes such as trypsin, lipase and amylase into the duodenum as they are needed.

The villi of the duodenum have a leafy-looking appearance, which is a histologically identifiable structure. Brunner's glands, which secrete mucus, are found in the duodenum only. The duodenum wall consists of a very thin layer of cells that form the muscularis mucosae.

Clinical significance

Ulceration

Ulcers of the duodenum commonly occur because of infection by the bacteria Helicobacter pylori. These bacteria, through a number of mechanisms, erode the protective mucosa of the duodenum, predisposing it to damage from gastric acids. The first part of the duodenum is the most common location of ulcers since it is where the acidic chyme meets the duodenal mucosa before mixing with the alkaline secretions of the duodenum. Duodenal ulcers may cause recurrent abdominal pain and dyspepsia, and are often investigated using a urea breath test to test for the bacteria, and endoscopy to confirm ulceration and take a biopsy. If managed, these are often managed through antibiotics that aim to eradicate the bacteria, and proton-pump inhibitors and antacids to reduce the gastric acidity.

Celiac disease
The British Society of Gastroenterology guidelines specify that a duodenal biopsy is required for the diagnosis of adult celiac disease. The biopsy is ideally performed at a moment when the patient is on a gluten-containing diet.

Cancer
Duodenal cancer is a cancer in the first section of the small intestine. Cancer of the duodenum is relatively rare compared to stomach cancer and colorectal cancer; malignant tumors in the duodenum constitute only around 0.3% of all the gastrointestinal tract tumors but around half of cancerous tissues that develop in the small intestine. Its histology is often observed to be adenocarcinoma, meaning that the cancerous tissue arises from glandular cells in the epithelial tissue lining the duodenum.

Inflammation
Inflammation of the duodenum is referred to as duodenitis. There are multiple known causes.

History 
The name duodenum is from Medieval Latin, short for intestīnum duodēnum digitōrum, which may be translated: intestine of twelve finger-widths (in length), from Latin duodēnum, genitive pl. of duodēnī, twelve each, from duodecim, twelve. The Latin phrase intestīnum duodēnum digitōrum is thought to be a loan-translation from the Greek word dodekadaktylon (δωδεκαδάκτυλον), literally "twelve fingers long." The intestinal section was so called by Greek physician Herophilus (c. 335–280 BCE) for its length, about equal to the breadth of 12 fingers.

Many languages retain a similar etymology for this word. For example, German  and Dutch .

Additional images

See also

 Pancreas
 Choledochoduodenostomy - a surgical procedure to create a connection between the common bile duct (CBD) and an alternative portion of the duodenum.

References

External links

 Duodenum at the Human Protein Atlas
 

Digestive system
Small intestine